The 2022  Cleveland Open  was a professional tennis tournament played on indoor hard courts. It was the fourth edition of the tournament which was part of the 2022 ATP Challenger Tour. It took place in Cleveland, Ohio, United States between January 31 and February 6, 2022.

Singles main-draw entrants

Seeds

 1 Rankings are as of January 17, 2022.

Other entrants
The following players received wildcards into the singles main draw:
  William Blumberg
  Aleksandar Kovacevic
  Keegan Smith

The following players received entry from the qualifying draw:
  Ulises Blanch
  Sebastian Fanselow
  Alexis Galarneau
  Rinky Hijikata
  Emilio Nava
  Roberto Quiroz

Champions

Singles

 Dominic Stricker def.  Yoshihito Nishioka 7–5, 6–1.

Doubles

 William Blumberg /  Max Schnur def.  Robert Galloway /  Jackson Withrow 6–3, 7–6(7–4).

References

External links
Official website

2022 ATP Challenger Tour
2022 in sports in Ohio
January 2022 sports events in the United States
February 2022 sports events in the United States
2022 in American tennis
2020s in Cleveland
Tennis in Cleveland